John Peers and Michael Venus were the defending champions, but Peers chose not to participate this year.

Venus played alongside Tim Pütz and successfully defended his title, defeating Kevin Krawietz and Horia Tecău in the final, 6–3, 6–7(3–7), [10–8].

Seeds

Draw

Draw

Qualifying

Seeds

Qualifiers
  Alessandro Giannessi /  Carlos Taberner

Lucky losers
  Ruben Gonzales /  Hunter Johnson

Qualifying draw

References

External Links
 Main Draw
 Qualifying Draw

Hamburg European Open - Doubles
Doubles men